Bourbon Township is one of eighteen townships in Callaway County, Missouri, USA.  As of the 2010 census, its population was 2,059.

History
Bourbon Township was established Feb 21, 1825, and named after Bourbon County, Kentucky.
The township was reduced in size by about one-third between 1883 and 1897 by the creation of Cleveland Township from what had up to that time been its northern sector. These changes are shown in historical maps listed in the bibliography of the article on Callaway County, Missouri, and are significant for historical and genealogical research.

Geography
It contains two cemeteries: Mount Olivet and White Cloud, while Reeds Lake is within this township, and the stream of Owl Creek runs through this township.

References

 USGS Geographic Names Information System (GNIS)

External links
 US-Counties.com
 City-Data.com

Townships in Callaway County, Missouri
Jefferson City metropolitan area
Townships in Missouri